Kadiaba Kadiel  (or Gadiaba Kadiel ) is a village and rural commune in the Cercle of Nioro in the Kayes Region of western Mali.

The commune includes eight settlements:
 Alana Massassi
 Fossé-Kaarta
 Gadiaba Boundounké
 Gadiaba-Dialla
 Gadiaba-Kadiel
 Gadiaba M’Bomoyabé
 Gourel–Céno–Dédji
 Sanbagoré

References

Communes of Kayes Region